The Very Best of Bonnie Tyler is a compilation album by Welsh singer Bonnie Tyler, released on 19 January 1993 by Columbia Records.

The Very Best of Bonnie Tyler peaked at no. 3 in Germany, where it became one of the best-selling albums of the year. It was nominated for Best CD of 1993 in the Female Singers' category at the Bravo Otto Awards, coming in 8th place. Due to its commercial success in Europe, Columbia released a second volume in 1994.

Background 
The Very Best of Bonnie Tyler was released by Columbia, Tyler's previous record label. She signed a new deal with Hansa Records in 1990. The compilation features selections from Tyler's RCA and CBS/Columbia albums, and her first Hansa album Bitterblue. The track list includes "I Can't Leave Your Love Alone", a b-side from Tyler's 1992 single "Where Were You".

The collection out-sold Tyler's then-current studio album Angel Heart.

Critical reception 

In a review for AllMusic, Tomas Mureika described The Very Best of Bonnie Tyler as "The closest thing there is to a career retrospective so far", and an "excellent choice" for record buyers seeking an overview of her early career.

Track listing

Charts

Year-end charts

Industry awards 
The Bravo Otto is a German accolade honoring excellence of performers in film, television and music. The awards are presented annually and voted by readers of Bravo magazine. The Very Best of Bonnie Tyler was nominated for Best CD of 1993 in the Female Singers' category, and came in 8th with 2.21% of the vote. Tyler's then-current studio album, Silhouette in Red, came in 9th place.

Certifications

References

1993 compilation albums
Bonnie Tyler compilation albums